Wilburn School District No. 44 or Wilburn Public Schools was a school district headquartered in Wilburn, an unincorporated area in Cleburne County, Arkansas. It operated Wilburn Public School, which had elementary and high school divisions. The mascot was the wildcat.

On July 1, 2004, the Wilburn School District consolidated into the Concord School District.

References

External links
 
 Wilburn School District No. 44 Cleburne County, Arkansas General Purpose Financial Statements and Other Reports June 30, 2002

Education in Cleburne County, Arkansas
Defunct school districts in Arkansas
2004 disestablishments in Arkansas
School districts disestablished in 2004